Mochloribatula texana is a species of mite in the family Mochlozetidae.

References

Acariformes
Articles created by Qbugbot
Animals described in 1909